The 2021 NASCAR Camping World Truck Series was the 27th season of the NASCAR Camping World Truck Series, a stock car racing series sanctioned by NASCAR in the United States. The season began at Daytona International Speedway with the NextEra Energy 250 on February 12. The regular season will end with the race at Watkins Glen International on August 7. The NASCAR playoffs will end with the Lucas Oil 150 at Phoenix Raceway on November 5. This season marks the 13th for Camping World Holdings as the series' title sponsor. After two years of advertising their Gander Outdoors retail chain in the title sponsorship, company CEO Marcus Lemonis announced on September 15, 2020, that the sponsorship would switch back to the Camping World brand beginning in 2021, which was the same name of the series from 2009 to 2018.

Following the Corn Belt 150 at Knoxville Raceway, John Hunter Nemechek of Kyle Busch Motorsports clinched the Regular Season Championship one race early. Toyota claimed its 12th Manufacturer Championship following the United Rentals 200 at Martinsville Speedway. At the season finale, Ben Rhodes of ThorSport Racing became the 2021 Truck Series champion.

Teams and drivers

Complete schedule

Limited schedule

Notes

Changes

Teams
 On June 10, 2020, Ray Ciccarelli announced that he would be closing down his CMI Motorsports team after the 2020 season as a result of him disagreeing with NASCAR's decision to ban the confederate flag (which happened after the murder of George Floyd and the subsequent Black Lives Matter protests), meaning his No. 49 and No. 83 trucks will not be returning in 2021. However, CMI hinted in a tweet on October 30 that they would return for the 2021 season in some capacity. The team would later announce that Tim Viens would run a full season in the No. 49 while the No. 83 would continue to run part-time with and a rotation of drivers, including Ciccarelli himself.
 On July 15, 2020, ARCA Menards Series team owner/driver Justin Carroll announced that his TC Motorsports team would run part-time in the Truck Series in 2021 after they purchased a race truck in the summer of 2020. The team's first race was going to come at the Daytona Road Course, but they later postponed their debut to Richmond (which they did not enter) with additional starts planned at Bristol in September (which they also did not enter) and Martinsville.
 On July 31, 2020, eventual 2020 ARCA Menards Series champion Bret Holmes told reporter Chris Knight that he was looking at debuting in the Truck Series for select races in 2021. On January 14, 2021, Holmes announced that he would be driving for his own team as it expands into the Truck Series. He and Sam Mayer will run partial schedules in the No. 32 truck. On March 6, 2021, it was revealed that the team had purchased the owner points of the No. 28 FDNY Racing truck, which attempted the season-opener at Daytona, in order to be more likely to qualify for races without qualifying if an entry list had over 40 trucks.
 On October 8, 2020, Trey Hutchens revealed that he and his team planned on expanding their part-time schedule to between 8 and 12 races in 2021, after previously attempting 5 and 3 races in 2020 and 2019, respectively.
 On November 13, 2020, it was announced that Lira Motorsports would be returning to the series for the first time since 2016, fielding a part-time entry for late model and NASCAR Roots driver Logan Misuraca. She and the team also announced that they would run part-time in the ARCA Menards Series in 2021. Misuraca revealed in an interview in April that her deal with Lira had fallen through. Soon after, she joined On Point Motorsports to potentially drive the No. 30 with Camping World sponsorship during Marcus Lemonis' efforts to get all trucks in each race sponsored. She filmed a video to try to get Camping World and Lemonis to sponsor her, but as of August 2021, no deal has been put together.
 On December 1, 2020, McAnally-Hilgemann Racing announced that they would field a truck at the season-finale at Phoenix that will be driven by one of the drivers who participated in their new Driver Academy Series. All of the drivers who win a race in that series will be put into a drawing, and the winner of that drawing will get to drive this truck in this one race. With Derek Kraus returning to the team's No. 19 in 2021, this entry for the team at Phoenix will be a second part-time McAnally truck.
 On December 18, 2020, driver Willie Allen and Rackley Roofing owner Curtis Sutton announced the formation of the team Rackley WAR, fielding the No. 25 full-time for Timothy Peters. On June 1, 2021, the team announced that Peters would be released and replaced with JR Motorsports Xfinity Series driver Josh Berry for the next three races. On June 3, Rackley WAR announced that Hendrick Motorsports Cup Series driver William Byron would make his first Truck Series start since his seven-win full season in the series in 2016, driving a part-time second truck, the No. 27, for the team.
 On January 13, 2021, it was announced that Hattori Racing Enterprises would be adding a part-time second truck in 2021 for Max McLaughlin. The races that it will be entered in and its number have yet to be announced. McLaughlin, the son of retired NASCAR driver Mike McLaughlin, ran full-time for the team in their ARCA Menards Series East No. 1 car in 2019 and 2020, but will not return to that ride in 2021 in order to concentrate on his dirt racing efforts. Max has one prior Truck start, which came in the 2018 Eldora Dirt Derby for Niece Motorsports.
 On January 14, 2021, it was announced that Win-Tron Racing would merge into AM Racing, a Truck Series team that they have had an alliance with for multiple years and that they have shared a race shop with beginning in 2020.
 On January 22, 2021, Spencer Davis announced that he and his team would be running the full season in 2021, after previously running part-time in 2020. After failing to qualify for the season-opener at Daytona, they did not attempt the next two races (the Daytona Road Course and Las Vegas). The team returned in the next race at Atlanta, as it was announced on March 20 that Davis had acquired the owner points of the No. 8 NEMCO Motorsports truck, which would allow his team to run the entire season since the No. 8 had attempted the first two races of the season. On March 18, the team announced that full-time Cup Series driver and 2014 Eldora Dirt Derby winner Bubba Wallace would return to the Truck Series to drive their No. 11 in the Bristol dirt race, which would be fielded in a collaboration with Hattori Racing Enterprises for this race.
 On January 29, 2021, it was announced that Young's Motorsports would expand back up to three full-time trucks in 2021 with the re-addition of the No. 12, which was driven by Tate Fogleman, who drove the team's No. 02 in 2021, which will now be driven by Kris Wright.
 On March 6, 2021, it was revealed that Henderson Motorsports had purchased the owner points of Clay Greenfield's No. 68 truck, which ran nearly the full season in 2020, to use for their No. 75 truck for the rest of the season.
 On March 17, 2021, Ryan Newman revealed that he would be entering the Bristol dirt race with a new team, DCC Racing, owned by Brad Means. The team used the No. 39, Newman's number when he drove for Stewart-Haas Racing in the Cup Series, and was a Ford, the manufacturer Newman drives in the Cup Series with Roush Fenway Racing. Brad Means is the son of Jimmy Means, the team owner of Xfinity Series team Jimmy Means Racing. On August 27, 2021, it was announced that DCC would be partnering with Reaume Brothers Racing to jointly field Dylan Lupton in the No. 34 RBR truck for the last four races of the season.

Drivers
 On August 28, 2020, it was announced that Chris Hacker would be joining Cram Racing Enterprises, starting with one ARCA start in 2020 (which ended up being the West Series season-finale at Phoenix), which would be followed by the 2021 ARCA season-opener at Daytona, and then either a part-time or full-time schedule in the Truck Series, depending on sponsorship. On June 1, 2021, Hacker tweeted that he would be driving Cram's No. 41 truck at Nashville, although the team later refuted that statement hours later. On June 2, CRE and Hacker parted ways, supposedly over the team's frustration of Hacker "announcing" his start prematurely. On August 16, 2021, it was announced that Hacker would make his Truck Series debut at Gateway in the No. 34 for Reaume Brothers Racing in a partnership with On Point Motorsports.
 On September 24, 2020, it was announced that Carson Hocevar, who drove part-time in the Nos. 40 and 42 for Niece Motorsports in 2020, would return to the team in 2021 to run full-time and for Rookie of the Year in the No. 42 truck.
 On September 27, 2020, it was announced that West Series driver Keith McGee would drive for Reaume Brothers Racing at some point during the 2021 season. He was scheduled to run the race at Talladega in the team's No. 33 truck in 2020, but was not approved to make his debut due to his lack of superspeedway experience coupled with how there was no practice and qualifying due to COVID-19. As a result, the team announced his first start with them would be pushed back a year. On January 18, 2021, Reaume announced that McGee's first race would be at Richmond in the No. 33. In addition, the team stated that he could run more races in 2021 if sponsorship could be found.
 On October 17, 2020, Ford Performance announced that Hailie Deegan would run full-time and for Rookie of the Year in a DGR-Crosley truck in 2021. She drove for the team full-time in the ARCA Menards Series in 2020 along with making one Truck Series start.
 On October 29, 2020, Frontstretch reporter Kevin Rutherford revealed that Howie DiSavino III had told him that he would make his Truck Series debut in 2021. Before COVID-19 hit, DiSavino III had planned on doing so in 2020 in the race at Richmond in a No. 32 truck for Win-Tron Racing. On April 5, it was announced that DiSavino's first race would still come at Richmond, but it would be in the No. 3 for Jordan Anderson Racing.
 On November 10, 2020, NASCAR issued an indefinite suspension to Josh Reaume for an allegedly antisemitic post on social media that violated Sections 12.1 and 12.8.1.e in the NASCAR Rule Book. Reaume was reinstated by NASCAR on March 31, 2021.
 On November 12, 2020, it was announced that Brett Moffitt would move up to the Xfinity Series full-time in 2021, driving the Our Motorsports No. 02 car which he drove in many races in 2020 and leaving his full-time Truck Series ride in the No. 23 for GMS Racing. The following day, GMS announced that Chase Purdy would be a full-time driver for the team, replacing Moffitt, with the truck crew chief to be determined. Purdy drove part-time in the team's No. 24 in 2020. On August 5, 2021, Purdy tested positive for COVID-19, forcing him to miss Watkins Glen while A. J. Allmendinger substituted for him.
 On November 19, 2020, it was revealed that pending the signing of contracts, Tim Viens would drive full-time in the No. 49 for CMI Motorsports in 2021, after having entered a majority of the races in 2020 for the team in either the No. 49 or No. 83 truck. Viens later ended up driving the No. 83 instead of the No. 49.
 On November 23, 2020, it was announced that John Hunter Nemechek would return to the Truck Series full-time in 2021 to drive the Kyle Busch Motorsports No. 4, replacing Raphaël Lessard. Nemechek drove the Front Row Motorsports No. 38 in the Cup Series in 2020 as well as a part-time schedule in the No. 8 for his family team, NEMCO Motorsports.
 On November 24, 2020, Ryan Truex, who ran part-time in the No. 40 for Niece Motorsports in 2020, announced that he would return for a full-time season in the same truck in 2021.
 On November 25, 2020, it was announced that Raphaël Lessard would drive in the No. 24 for 12 races for GMS Racing, with the possibility of a full season if sponsorship could be found. Lessard ran full-time in the No. 4 for Kyle Busch Motorsports in 2020. On January 7, 2021, GMS announced that Lessard would be able to run the full season after the team found additional sponsorship. However, on April 3, it was announced that sponsorship had dried up again and Lessard would be taken out of the truck.
 On December 2, 2020, Moffitt surprisingly announced that he would return to the Truck Series full-time, driving the Niece Motorsports No. 45, meaning that he will run full-time in both the Xfinity and Truck Series in 2021.
 On December 7, 2020, Kyle Busch Motorsports announced that Chandler Smith, who drove the Nos. 46 and 51 part-time for them for the previous two seasons, would replace Christian Eckes in the No. 18 in 2021 in his first full season in the Truck Series. Smith also competed part-time in the ARCA Menards Series for the previous three seasons with Venturini Motorsports, winning a total of nine races.
 On December 31, 2020, it was announced that Kris Wright would drive full-time for Young's Motorsports after driving part-time for GMS Racing in the 2020 ARCA Menards Series and a one-off truck race at the Daytona road course. He also drove part-time for JP Racing in the 2020 ARCA Menards Series West. Wright would later miss the Atlanta race and the Bristol dirt race after testing positive for COVID-19. JR Motorsports Xfinity Series driver Josh Berry substituted for Wright at Atlanta, and Trackhouse Cup Series driver Daniel Suárez substituted for Wright in the Bristol dirt race.
 On January 17, 2021, it was announced that Sam Mayer would drive the No. 75 for Henderson Motorsports in seven races, beginning at the Daytona Road Course, in addition to his part-time schedule in the No. 32 for Bret Holmes Racing. The rest of his schedule with Henderson has yet to be announced.
 On February 4, 2021, ThorSport Racing announced that Christian Eckes would drive 10 races in the No. 98 truck, sharing the ride with Grant Enfinger throughout the season.
 On February 15, 2021, Kyle Busch Motorsports announced that road course ringer Parker Chase would be in their No. 51 for the Daytona Road Course and Circuit of the Americas. Chase was Kyle Busch's teammate in the 2020 Rolex 24 and he made his stock car debut in the ARCA Menards Series race at the DRC in 2020.
 On February 26, 2021, Bill Lester announced on NASCAR Race Hub that he would be coming out of retirement to compete in the Truck Series race at his home track of Atlanta. He previously competed full-time in the series from 2002 to midway through 2007. On March 12, it was announced that Lester would drive the No. 17 for David Gilliland Racing.
 On March 4, 2021, Roper Racing announced that full-time Cup Series driver and accomplished dirt racer Chase Briscoe would return to the Truck Series to drive the No. 04 for the team in the Bristol dirt race, replacing team owner/driver Cory Roper in the truck. It was then announced on April 26 that Briscoe would also make a start on pavement for the team at Kansas.
 On March 15, 2021, Hill Motorsports announced that 2018 World of Outlaws Late Model Series champion Mike Marlar would drive their No. 56 in the Bristol dirt race. This will be his second start in the series after his debut at Eldora in 2019, where he finished fourth in the No. 33 for Reaume Brothers Racing.
 On March 17, 2021, Niece Motorsports announced that full-time Cup Series driver and accomplished dirt racer Kyle Larson would return to the Truck Series to drive the No. 44 for the team in the Bristol dirt race. This will also be his first start in the series since returning from his suspension in 2020.
 On April 8, 2021, Taylor Gray was forced to miss his first race at Richmond after suffering a fractured L4 vertebra, left foot, and ankle in a single-car accident in Statesville, NC. On July 6, David Gilliland Racing announced that he had recovered and would make his Truck Series debut at Watkins Glen.
 On April 14, 2021, CMI Motorsports announced that Ryan Reed would drive their No. 49 in the race at Richmond, which they were able to qualify for. This was Reed's first start in the Truck Series and in NASCAR since 2019 when he drove the DGR No. 17 at Las Vegas and only his second start since losing his full-time Xfinity Series ride with Roush Fenway Racing. He has worked as a driver coach during his time without a ride. Reed would then return to the truck in the next race at Kansas. On April 3, it was announced that Reed would  replace Raphaël Lessard in the No. 24 for GMS Racing at Darlington due to the lack of funding for Lessard to remain in the truck full-time.
 On April 19, 2021, Kyle Busch revealed in an interview that Corey Heim would make his Truck Series debut for his team at Darlington in the No. 51. Heim, a Toyota development driver, competes full-time in the ARCA Menards Series for Venturini Motorsports. He will also be in the truck at Martinsville.
 On April 21, 2021, C. J. McLaughlin revealed on an appearance on a podcast that he would drive for Reaume Brothers Racing in five races, which would include Kansas and Charlotte in the No. 34. McLaughlin previously drove for the team in the race at Iowa in 2019.
 On July 28, 2021, it was announced that ARCA Menards Series driver Toni Breidinger, who was scheduled to make her Truck Series debut at some point in 2021 in a part-time fourth Young's Motorsports truck, the No. 82, would be leaving the team to drive for Venturini Motorsports, the team she drove for part-time in ARCA in 2018.
 On September 10, 2021, Jordan Anderson Racing announced that Sage Karam would make his Truck Series debut in their No. 3 truck. The IndyCar driver made his NASCAR debut in the team's No. 31 car in the Xfinity Series race at the Indianapolis Motor Speedway road course.
 On October 18, 2021, it was announced that ARCA Menards Series West driver Dean Thompson would make his Truck Series debut in the season-finale at Phoenix. He also drove for the team in the main ARCA Menards Series season-finale at Kansas.

Crew chiefs
 On October 26, 2020, it was announced that Kyle Busch Motorsports crew chief Rudy Fugle, who won 28 races, two drivers' championships and five owners' championships in the Truck Series, would become the crew chief for William Byron (who he worked with in 2016) in the Cup Series for Hendrick Motorsports in 2021 after the retirement of Chad Knaus.
 On November 25, 2020, it was announced that Mike Hillman Jr. would join DGR-Crosley to be Hailie Deegan's crew chief in 2021. He previously worked for Kyle Busch Motorsports, serving as Raphaël Lessard's crew chief on the No. 4 truck in 2020.
 On December 8, 2020, Kyle Busch Motorsports announced changes to their crew chief lineup in 2021.
 Eric Phillips, who was a crew chief for KBM from 2010 to 2014, would return to the team to be the crew chief of the No. 4, now driven by John Hunter Nemechek, replacing Mike Hillman Jr, who left to crew chief Hailie Deegan at DGR-Crosley. Phillips was previously the car chief for Denny Hamlin's No. 11 Joe Gibbs Racing Cup Series team and prior to that, the crew chief of JGR's No. 18 Xfinity Series team.
 Danny Stockman Jr. will move from the No. 51 to the No. 18, now driven by Chandler Smith (who he previously worked with part-time in the No. 51), replacing Rudy Fugle, who left to crew chief the No. 24 of William Byron for Hendrick Motorsports in the Cup Series.
 Mardy Lindley, a four-time East Series championship-winning crew chief (including the last two years with Sam Mayer at GMS Racing), replaces Stockman as the crew chief of the No. 51.
 On December 10, 2020, it was announced that Kevin Bellicourt, who crew chiefed the No. 19 of Derek Kraus for McAnally-Hilgemann Racing in 2020, would be joining Spire Motorsports to crew chief their No. 77 car in the NASCAR Cup Series. He is the 2015 East Series championship-winning crew chief. 
 On December 22, 2020, Matt Noyce, who was the crew chief for the No. 99 of Ben Rhodes at ThorSport Racing for the last two years, and prior to that was the crew chief of Jesse Little's No. 97 team, was announced to be moving to McAnally-Hilgemann to replace Bellicourt as the crew chief for the No. 19 of Kraus. On April 1, 2021, McAnally-Hilgemann announced that Noyce had left the team and would be replaced by former MBM Motorsports Xfinity Series crew chief Mark Hillman. Noyce would move to Niece Motorsports, where he replaced Tim Mooney as crew chief of their No. 44 truck.
 On February 4, 2021, ThorSport Racing announced that Jeriod Prince would be the new crew chief for the No. 98 truck of Enfinger and Eckes. He has crew chiefed for the team in the past on the No. 13 truck in 2013 and 2014 and on the team's former ARCA car, the No. 44 of Frank Kimmel, in 2012 and 2013. They also announced that the crew chief for the No. 99 truck of Rhodes would be Rich Lushes, who was the crew chief of ThorSport's No. 13 in 2018 when it was driven by Myatt Snider. Both Prince and Lushes had been truck chiefs after the years they were crew chiefs for ThorSport.
 On April 30, 2021, it was announced that Shane Wilson had been released as crew chief of the No. 15 truck of Tanner Gray for David Gilliland Racing. Seth Smith, who is one of the crew chiefs of DGR's part-time No. 17 truck, became the interim crew chief for the No. 15 starting at Kansas.
 On May 4, 2021, it was revealed that Niece Motorsports would be making changes to their crew chief lineup beginning at Darlington. Phil Gould, who was the crew chief for the No. 45, moves to the No. 42 of Carson Hocevar. The previous crew chief of the No. 42, Cody Efaw, moved to the No. 44, replacing Matt Noyce, who replaced Gould as the crew chief of the No. 45.
 On May 28, 2021, it was revealed that Jon Leonard would be replacing Tripp Bruce as Stewart Friesen's crew chief. Leonard was an engineer for the team and previously a crew chief for Todd Gilliland and Front Row Motorsports in the Truck Series and an engineer and interim crew chief with Leavine Family Racing in the Cup Series. Bruce is also the team's competition director and moved to that role full-time after Leonard's promotion to crew chief.

Interim crew chiefs
 Danny Stockman Jr. was the crew chief of the No. 51 Kyle Busch Motorsports truck in 2020 and was suspended for three races after the truck had a loose wheel during one of their pit stops in the SpeedyCash.com 400 at Texas on October 25, 2020. Because there were only two races left in the season, the third race of his suspension came at the 2021 season-opener at Daytona. Wes Ward was the interim crew chief at Martinsville and Phoenix in 2020. Stockman moved from the No. 51 to the No. 18 truck for KBM in 2021. 1992 Cup Series champion crew chief Paul Andrews, who joined KBM as their new shop foreman for 2021 after previously being a crew chief for the closed Chad Bryant Racing team in the ARCA Menards Series, filled in for Stockman at Daytona.
 On March 15, 2021, it was announced that Patrick Magee, a crew chief for MBM Motorsports in the Xfinity Series, would substitute for Greg Ely as the crew chief for the No. 56 Hill Motorsports truck at the Bristol dirt race because Ely had an illness. Magee was available with the Xfinity Series off that weekend. The driver of that truck for that race was Mike Marlar, who also was driving MBM's No. 66 in the Cup Series Bristol dirt race, a car usually driven by Hill Motorsports driver/co-owner Timmy Hill.
 On June 18, 2021, David Gilliland Racing's No. 15 truck, driven by Tanner Gray, and the DGR-aligned No. 38 Front Row Motorsports truck, driven by Todd Gilliland, both failed pre-qualifying inspection before the race at Nashville. Crew chiefs Seth Smith and Chris Lawson were ejected from the track and replaced by interim crew chiefs Jacob Hampton (the engineer for Gray's No. 15) and David Gilliland (DGR owner, part-time driver, and father of Todd Gilliland).
 On October 6, 2021, NASCAR indefinitely suspended Young's Motorsports No. 2 crew chief Eddie Troconis for violation of Sections 12.8.1.c Behavioral.

Manufacturers
 On January 8, 2021, Ray Ciccarelli revealed that he would be upgrading the equipment for CMI Motorsports ahead of the 2021 season. Over the offseason, he bought a Ford from ThorSport Racing (which switched manufacturers for 2021) as well as a Toyota from another team which was not specified. In turn, he then sold some of his old Chevy trucks. CMI now has trucks from all three manufacturers in their fleet, which Ciccarelli stated is in order to attract part-time drivers to the team that have a contract with one of the manufacturers.
 On January 18, 2021, ThorSport Racing announced that Ford would not be their manufacturer in 2021. On February 4, the team announced that they would be switching back to Toyota, which was their manufacturer from 2012 to 2017.

Sponsorship
 On November 19, 2020, it was revealed that Tim Viens' primary sponsors in 2021 on the CMI Motorsports No. 49 truck (it ended up instead being the No. 83) would be Subsafe (who sponsored him once in 2020 in the Pocono race) and Boat Gadget, who replace Patriots PAC of America, which was a PAC for President Donald Trump's 2020 re-election campaign.
 On January 14, 2021, it was announced that Credit MRI would join Young's Motorsports and sponsor the No. 20 of Spencer Boyd in multiple races in 2021.
 On March 1, 2021, Marcus Lemonis, the CEO of series title sponsor Camping World, tweeted that he would offer 15,000 to any team that ran the race at Las Vegas in March with a Camping World paint scheme. All the teams (10 in total) that were set to be unsponsored received sponsorship from Camping World, and those teams were GMS Racing's No. 2 of Sheldon Creed and No. 24 of Raphaël Lessard, Jordan Anderson in his team's No. 3, Norm Benning in his team's No. 6, Grant Enfinger in CR7 Motorsports' No. 9, both of the Reaume Brothers Racing trucks (the No. 33 of Jesse Iwuji and the No. 34 of B. J. McLeod), Dawson Cram in his team's No. 41, Tyler Hill in his team's No. 56, and the Henderson Motorsports No. 75 of Parker Kligerman. 
 Lemonis would do the same thing for the next race at Atlanta, but this time with his Overton's company. Creed's No. 2, Anderson's No. 3, Benning's No. 6, the Reaume No. 34 (driven by Ryan Ellis in that race), Cram's No. 41, and Kligerman's No. 75 would again receive backing from Lemonis and had Overton's sponsorship. The GMS No. 21 of Zane Smith and Niece Motorsports Nos. 40, 42 and 45 of Ryan Truex, Carson Hocevar, and Brett Moffitt, respectively, also carried sponsorship from Lemonis through the Overton's brand for the first time. In addition to those ten Overton's trucks, Camping World was one of the sponsors on Bill Lester's No. 17 truck for DGR that weekend.
 On August 31, 2021, Young's Motorsports announced that DogeCola, a beverage brand owned by Dogecoin, would sponsor the No. 12 at Darlington.

Rule changes
 NASCAR has increased the field count of the Truck Series to 36 trucks per race, which was the same field count of the series until the 2014 season. In the races without practice or qualifying, the field count will be expanded to a maximum of 40 vehicles, similar to 2020 due to the COVID-19 pandemic.

Schedule

Daytona, Phoenix, Texas, Circuit of the Americas, and Gateway revealed their race dates ahead of the release of the entire schedule, which NASCAR announced on November 19, 2020.  The schedule has since been adjusted twice, with the most recent changes announced on May 25, 2021.

Note: The Triple Truck Challenge races (the first race at Darlington and races at Circuit of the Americas and Charlotte) are listed in bold.

Broadcasting
Fox will air the entirety of the schedule in 2021, as their contract TV deal goes through 2024. It has yet to be announced whether any races will be aired on the main Fox network. The vast majority of the races are broadcast on FS1, but typically changes are made during the season.

Fox made a change to their broadcasting lineup for their Truck Series coverage for the 2021 season, as pit reporter Alan Cavanna was released by the network ahead of the season.

Schedule changes

There is one less race on the schedule, as it now contains 22 races instead of 23. This is also the first time since 2000 that the Truck Series has had more than one road course race (when Watkins Glen and Portland International Raceway were on the schedule). The original schedule had three road course races, the most since 1999 (when it had those two races plus Topeka). The current schedule features three such events (Daytona road course, Austin, Watkins Glen).

 Eldora Speedway, the series' original dirt race which had been on the schedule since 2013 (except for 2020 when it was removed due to COVID-19), was replaced by a race at Knoxville Raceway in Iowa, home of the Knoxville Nationals, which will be run on Friday, July 9.
 The series has two dirt races for the first time with the addition of a spring race at Bristol, which will see dirt temporarily put onto the track's surface. The Cup Series will also be running with the Truck Series on that weekend. This race replaces the race at Kentucky Speedway, which will not host any NASCAR races in 2021.
 Circuit of the Americas replaces the INDYCAR weekend race at Texas (which was run at the playoff weekend for Cup last year because of the pandemic).  This gives the series a second road course race.
 After a 21 year absence, Watkins Glen returns to the schedule for the first time since 2000, giving the series a third road course race. The race will be in August on the same weekend as the Cup and Xfinity races there. This race replaces the race at Michigan, which will not host a Truck race for the first time since 2001 because of logistics.
 Nashville Superspeedway is added to the schedule, replacing Dover, as is also the case with the Cup and Xfinity Series. This is the first race for the series at Nashville since 2011. The series will not race at Dover at all this season. It is the first time since 1999 where the track has not been on the schedule.
 Iowa Speedway is permanently taken off the schedule after its race on the 2020 schedule was removed as part of the COVID-19 schedule changes.
 Darlington Raceway, which was not originally on the 2020 schedule but added on as part of the COVID-19 schedule changes, becomes a permanent event for the first time since 2011. The race moves from Labor Day weekend to May as part of the new second Cup and Xfinity Series races at the track on Mother's Day weekend in May, as the annual throwback weekend moves from Darlington's Cup Playoff weekend to the spring weekend for 2021.
 Canadian Tire Motorsport Park was scheduled to return to the schedule after being taken off of the 2020 schedule during the season as part of the COVID-19 schedule changes. CTMP was to be the Truck race run on Labor Day weekend, its usual spot on the schedule, with Darlington, (which was on that weekend in 2020) moving to May.

Schedule changes due to the COVID-19 pandemic
 Due to state COVID regulations in California, NASCAR cancelled the Cup and Xfinity races at Auto Club Speedway, scheduled for February 27 and 28, and those races were moved to the Daytona infield road course (the Truck Series did not have a race scheduled at Auto Club this season). With the season-opening races for all three series at Daytona being two weeks before, NASCAR made the Daytona Road Course the second race of the season for all three series, bumping the Homestead races back by one week to where Auto Club had been, along with cancelling the Truck Series race at Homestead and moving it to the Daytona Road Course for financial and logistics reasons (NASCAR could keep timing and scoring equipment at the circuit an additional week instead of setting it up and taking it down for two trips to Daytona within three weeks). 
 Due to COVID-19 restrictions in terms of international travel, the race at Canadian Tire Motorsport Park was removed again and replaced by a second race at Darlington Raceway.  The second Darlington date will be held on Sunday afternoon before the Cup Series Cook Out Southern 500 that evening.

Results and standings

Race results

Drivers' championship

(key) Bold – Pole position awarded by time. Italics – Pole position set by final practice results or owner's points. * – Most laps led. 1 – Stage 1 winner. 2 – Stage 2 winner. 1-10 – Regular season top 10 finishers.
. – Eliminated after Round of 10
. – Eliminated after Round of 8

Owners' championship (Top 15)
(key) Bold – Pole position awarded by time. Italics – Pole position set by final practice results or owner's points. * – Most laps led. 1 – Stage 1 winner. 2 – Stage 2 winner. 1-10 – Regular season top 10 finishers.
. – Eliminated after Round of 10
. – Eliminated after Round of 8

Manufacturers' championship

See also
 2021 NASCAR Cup Series
 2021 NASCAR Xfinity Series
 2021 ARCA Menards Series
 2021 ARCA Menards Series East
 2021 ARCA Menards Series West
 2021 NASCAR Whelen Modified Tour
 2021 NASCAR Pinty's Series
 2021 NASCAR PEAK Mexico Series
 2021 NASCAR Whelen Euro Series
 2021 eNASCAR iRacing Pro Invitational Series
 2021 SRX Series

References

Camping World Truck Series